Kenneth McKay (circa 1876 – unknown) was a Scottish association footballer who played as a forward.

Born in Wishaw, McKay started his footballing career with Hamilton Academical before moving south to play for Sheffield United. In the 1897–98 season McKay was a member of the Sheffield side which won the 1897–98 First Division. McKay spent a single season with Tottenham Hotspur making his debut on 3 September 1898 in a 3–0 home win against Thames Ironworks at Northumberland Park. The next season, he moved to Thames Ironworks, his first goals coming on 18 September 1899 in a 4–0 home win against Chatham. The following season, he returned to Scotland, playing a single season with Wishaw United. 1901 saw him on the move again; this time back to London to play for Fulham for the 1901–02 season. In the 1902–03 season McKay was a member of the Fulham side which won the 1902–03 Southern League Second Division.

References

Sportspeople from Wishaw
Scottish footballers
Association football forwards
Hamilton Academical F.C. players
Thames Ironworks F.C. players
Wishaw Juniors F.C. players
Fulham F.C. players
Sheffield United F.C. players
Tottenham Hotspur F.C. players
1870s births
Date of death unknown
Southern Football League players
English Football League players
Footballers from North Lanarkshire